At the 1923 Far Eastern Championship Games, the athletics events were held in Osaka, Japan in May. A total of 19 men's athletics events were contested at the competition. It was the last time that track events were conducted over imperial distances, as the competition aligned with international standards in 1925 and began using metric distances. The triple jump event was contested for the first time.

Japan was the foremost nation in the athletics competition on this occasion. The hosts won twelve of the nineteen events and had a gold or silver medallist in all but three of the contests. This included a complete medal sweep of all middle- and long-distance track events. The Philippines, the champions at the previous edition, won six gold medals and ten silver medals. The Chinese had their worst showing yet in athletics, managing just two medals. As last place finishers, they received a bronze for the 220-yard relay. Yu Huaian was their only individual medallist, although he performed well by winning the high jump in a games record.

Fortunato Catalon extended his run of victories in both the 100 and 220-yard sprints, becoming double sprint champion for a fourth time in a row. Katsuo Okazaki, defended his mile run title and went one better than his 1923 880-yards runner-up finish to achieve a middle-distance double. He later represented Japan at the 1924 Summer Olympics and went on to become the Japanese Minister of Foreign Affairs. Mikio Oda emerged as a top international athlete with wins in the long jump and triple jump, as well as a high jump bronze. He would later go on to become the first individual Olympic champion from Asia at the 1928 Amsterdam Olympics. Yonetaro Nakazawa, the pole vault winner here, was Japan's flag bearer at that games.

Japan's Nobuyuki Yoshioka defended his title in the five-mile run from the 1921 games and Filipino decathlete Juan Taduran also achieved that feat in his event.

Medal summary

References

Results
Far Eastern Championships. GBR Athletics. Retrieved on 2014-12-18.

1923
Far Eastern Championship Games
1923 Far Eastern Championship Games